Al Suhail is a traditional name that can be used to refer to several different stars:

 Canopus
 Gamma Velorum
 Lambda Velorum